Hacılı (also, Gadzhily and Gadzhyly) is a village in the Jabrayil Rayon of Azerbaijan. It was occupied by the Armenian forces in 1993. The village came under the control of Azerbaijan around 19 October 2020.

References 

 

Populated places in Jabrayil District